Kireeti Damaraju is an Indian Telugu film actor. He has learned acting and done Theatre before venturing into films. He has played supporting and well noted roles in films such as Uyyala Jampala (2013), Yevade Subramanyam (2015), Vunnadhi Okate Zindagi (2017) and Mental Madhilo (2017). He was also a contestant on the hit reality TV show Bigg Boss 2.

Career
Kireeti Damaraju started his acting career by learning acting and doing few Theatre shows and then started acting on screen with the short films Ontiganta and Anukokunda. Anukokunda, which was selected for Cannes gave him the jump start to land in the role of "Subbarao" in the movie Second Hand. In Bham Bolenath, Damaraju plays the role of a drug addict with Naveen Chandra and Idlebrain.com Jeevi remarks that "Pradeep and Kireeti's characters remind us of Ramesh-Suresh duo from Cadbury ads." He also acted in Many Happy Returns, a sitcom directed by Gunnam Gangaraju. Srividya Palaparthi of Times of India praises Damaraju saying "While Tarun and Avanthika's acting skills were evidently amateur, Kireeti Damaraju stood out in terms of acting, and comic timing."

Before venturing into the Telugu Film Industry, Damaraju worked for Electronic Arts, Hyderabad. He is also an avid gamer and a usability engineering expert. A lot of his thought process and philosophy in life have been inspired from his deep interests in Japanese anime and manga.

Filmography

References

External links

Living people
Indian male film actors
Male actors in Telugu cinema
21st-century Indian male actors
1986 births
Bigg Boss (Telugu TV series) contestants
Male actors from Andhra Pradesh
Telugu male actors